Maotianoascus octonarius is an extinct species of stem-group ctenophore, known from the Chinese Maotianshan shales of Yunnan. It is dated to Cambrian Stage 3 and belongs to late Early Cambrian strata.

The species is remarkable for its set of eight massive lobes.

References

Maotianshan shales fossils
Monotypic ctenophore genera
Prehistoric ctenophore genera